Raising Steam is the 40th Discworld novel, written by Terry Pratchett. It was the penultimate one, published before his death in 2015. Originally due to be published on 24 October 2013, it was pushed back to 7 November 2013 (and March 18, 2014 in the U.S.). It stars Moist von Lipwig, and features the introduction of locomotives to the Discworld (a concept mentioned already in Death's Domain), and an entirely new character.

The cover of the novel was exclusively revealed on Pratchett's Facebook page on 6 August 2013.

An update to Pratchett's website late October 2013 revealed that characters include Harry King, Moist von Lipwig, Adora Belle Dearheart and Sgt Fred Colon amongst others.

Plot synopsis
Dick Simnel, a young self-taught engineer from Sto Lat (and whose father, Ned Simnel, appeared in Reaper Man), has invented a steam locomotive.  He brings his invention to Ankh-Morpork where it catches the interest of Sir Harry King, a millionaire businessman who has made his fortune in the waste and sanitation industry, as he wishes to create a legacy disassociated from the source of his wealth. Harry promises Dick sufficient investment to make the railway a success.

The Patrician of Ankh-Morpork, Lord Vetinari, wishing to ensure that the City has appropriate influence over the new enterprise, appoints the reformed fraudster turned civil servant Moist von Lipwig to represent the government in the management of the railway.  His skills soon come in useful in negotiations with landowners along the route of the new line.

Throughout the story, Dwarfish fundamentalists are responsible for a number of terrorist attacks, including the murder and arson.  This campaign culminates in a palace coup in Überwald, whilst the King is at an international summit in Quirm, over twelve hundred miles away.  Vetinari declares that it is imperative to return the King to Schmaltzberg as soon as possible in order to restore political stability, and gives Moist the task of getting him there via the new railway.  Moist protests impossibility on the grounds that the railway is nowhere near complete, but is told that achieving this target is non-negotiable.

On the journey there are numerous attacks by Dwarfish fundamentalists,  but eventually the train reaches its destination and the King retakes Schmaltzberg with little resistance.

Back in Ankh-Morpork, there are honours and medals all round except for Moist who is told  that his reward is to remain alive.

Characters
 Dick Simnel – inventor of Iron Girder, Discworld's first steam train (Discworld's answer to Roundworld 's George Stephenson).
 Lord Vetinari – Patrician of Ankh-Morpork
 Moist von Lipwig
 Harry King
 Low King Rhys Rhysson
 Adora Belle von Lipwig
 Samuel Vimes

Reception

Science fiction author Cory Doctorow, in his review on Boing Boing, remarked that Pratchett "never quite balanced whimsy and gravitas as carefully as this, and it works beautifully. This is a spectacular novel, and a gift from a beloved writer to his millions of fans."

Ben Aaronovitch for The Guardian, noted that, while Raising Steam may be "heavy-handed" in its moralising, Pratchett "can be forgiven" because he remains one of the most consistently funny writers in the business.

Sara Sklaroff for The Washington Post, praised Pratchett's innate ability to balance the silly and the serious. Pratchett "blasts fundamentalists who resist all progress." But mostly he seems to be "having fun with words in the very British strain of absurdist humor."

Karin L Kross for Tor.com, praised Raising Steam as "the latest transformation of a remarkable fictional world that has evolved and grown with its creator."

Far Beyond Reality was more critical and found the writing "not as crisp as it used to be" and the characters "starting to blend together".

References

External links

 
 Raising Steam review on Boing Boing
 Raising Steam review on SFReader

2013 British novels
2013 fantasy novels
Discworld books
British comedy novels
Doubleday (publisher) books